Down High School is a controlled co-educational grammar school located in Downpatrick, County Down, Northern Ireland. The school has students from the ages of eleven to eighteen in the senior school — of which there are approximately 970 pupils. On 21 July 2014, John O'Dowd, the education minister, approved a development proposal to close the preparatory department of Down High School and it closed on 30 June 2014. There are roughly 250 pupils engaged in A-level study in the sixth form. In July 2015, some £20 million was granted by the education minister to begin the new build project in 2017.

History

The gate house and stone walls surrounding the school were originally part of the county gaol. The stone walls were lowered to the deck when the school was established. It was argued that removing the walls completely would allow fog from the nearby River Quoile to rise into school grounds. There were tunnels, now sealed off, beneath the school and grounds which were used to transport prisoners to and from the court house on English Street. Convicts sentenced to death would often be hanged in the main gateway in front of the school. The large granite gatehouse is a prominent feature of the Mount Crescent area and is unused. Many of the classes are taught in temporary classrooms.

School crest
The school's crest, designed by the late RWH Blackhood of Loughinisland near Downpatrick, is a reminder of another link with the past, dating back to the 12th century. The design itself is based upon the supposed badge of John De Courcy, the Norman soldier who captured Downpatrick in 1177 and established himself as the ruler of the north east of Ireland. The colours of the crest are taken from the arms of the Anglo-Irish aristocrat, Lady Elizabeth Cromwell (1674–1709), the daughter of the 4th Earl of Ardglass, and owner of the Downpatrick estate. Lady Elizabeth was wife of the Rt Hon Edward Southwell, MP for Kinsale, and principal secretary of state for Ireland in the reigns of William III and Anne. Southwell was a well known benefactor of the town.

The school's motto, Floreat Dunum, Absque Labore Nihil, means "May Down Flourish, nothing is achieved without effort". Floreat Dunum appears on the blazer badge of the school. Previous pupils are known as "Old Dunumians".

School houses
Students, upon entry into the secondary school, are placed one of five houses:
 Down (house colour: purple)
 Lecale (house colour: blue)
 Rathkeltair (house colour: red)
 Mourne (house colour: green)
 Strangford (house colour: white)

Notable alumni

 The members of the band Ash
 Ashleigh Baxter, Irish women's rugby player
 Dermot Nesbitt, Northern Irish minister for the environment and MLA for South Down from 1998 to 2007
 Denise McBride, joint-first female judge of the High Court of Northern Ireland
 Alister McGrath, Professor of Historical Theology at the University of Oxford and co-author of The Dawkins Delusion?
 The 28th Lord de Ros, Northern Irish aristocrat, who attended Down High School before going to boarding school in the Republic of Ireland
 Jim Patterson, first-class cricketer
 Gareth Russell, historian and bestselling author of Young and Damned and Fair
 Tommy Seymour, rugby payer - Glasgow Warriors winger, 36 caps for Scotland scoring 16 tries, British and Irish Lion touring New Zealand in 2017

Staff
The current headteacher is Mrs M. Perry, the deputy headteacher is K. Dawson.  The vice-principals are G. McKillen and R. Daniells.

References

External link

Grammar schools in County Down
Downpatrick